Index-linked Savings Certificates are inflation linked bonds from National Savings and Investments, the state-owned savings bank in the United Kingdom. The bond terms are typically 2,3 or 5 years. The returns are linked to the  RPI (not CPI) with an escalating premium on top. The escalation encourages bonds to be held to term with higher return over inflation in the later years. From 1 May 2019 onwards the returns on bonds that are renewed will be linked to CPI rather than RPI.

Bonds can be cashed in at any time. Bonds cashed in the first year sacrifice their increases to date and return only the initial deposit. Bonds cashed in beyond the first year yield the RPI indexing and premiums up to that month.

Index-linked Savings Certificates are free from UK income tax making them relatively attractive to tax-payers, particularly higher rate tax-payers. They are backed by the Treasury of the UK Government so are considered to be safe deposits.

The bonds come in issues. Each issue has a per person investment limit, currently 15000 pounds.

The certificates used to be known as "Granny Bonds" because they were originally only available to savers who were over the retirement age.

On 19 July 2010, due to high investment levels the certificates were withdrawn from general sale in order to keep investments within the financing target set by HM Treasury. After re-introduction this happened again on 7 September 2011.

External links

 Index-linked Savings Certificates Homepage.
 Past Issues from InvestmentGuide.
 UK Inflation and Where to find RPI data from the Office for National Statistics.
 NS&I Index-Linked Savings: Q&A from The Daily Telegraph.

References

 

Tax-advantaged savings plans in the United Kingdom
Finance in the United Kingdom
Inflation in the United Kingdom
Government bonds issued by the United Kingdom